Victoriano is both a given name and a surname. It may refer to:

Surname
Angelo Victoriano (born 1968), Angolan basketball player
Edmar Victoriano (born 1975), Angolan basketball player
Lucas Victoriano (born 1977), Argentine basketball player
Ruben Victoriano, also known as Ruvik, main antagonist in The Evil Within

Given name
Victoriano Castellanos (1795–1862), Honduran politician and President of Honduras
Victoriano Crémer (1906–2009), Spanish poet and journalist
Victoriano G. de Ysasi (1816–1881), Spanish wine merchant and philatelist
Victoriano Guisasola y Menéndez (1852–1920), Spanish Roman Catholic cardinal
Victoriano Huerta (1850–1916), Mexican military officer and President of Mexico
Victoriano Leguizamón (1922–2007), Paraguayan footballer and manager
Victoriano Lillo Catalán, Argentine writer
Victoriano Lorenzo (died 1903), Panamanian military officer
Victoriano Ramírez (died 1929), Mexican military officer
Victoriano Salado Álvarez (1867–1931), Mexican writer and politician
Victoriano Sarmientos (born 1956), Cuban volleyball player
Victoriano Sosa (born 1974), Dominican Republic boxer

See also
Don Victoriano Chiongbian, Misamis Occidental, municipality of the Philippines
Victoriano Arenas, Argentine football club